United Seychelles is a political party in Seychelles. It publishes a newspaper called The People. It was known as the Seychelles People's Progressive Front until June 2009, when it changed its name to the People's Party (Seychellois Creole: Parti Lepep, PL). The party changed its name again in November 2018, from the People's Party to United Seychelles.

The party was founded in 1964 by France-Albert René, under the name Seychelles People's United Party, and it was led by him from its inception. The SPUP was the ruling party from 1977 to 2020 and was the sole legal party in the country from 1979 to 1991 (this period is referred to retrospectively as the "Second Republic"). The party is led by a Central Executive Committee.

Leading members of the party over the years have been René, James Michel (formerly the chief of staff of the armed forces, information minister, finance minister and vice president from 1996 to 2004; he was the President of Seychelles from 2004 to 2016), Guy Sinon, Jacques Hodoul (a former foreign minister who was regarded as the party's chief ideologue), Joseph Belmont (former Vice president of Seychelles), and Maxime Ferrari (a former René loyalist who later supported the opposition and wrote an autobiography).

Former Vice president of Seychelles Vincent Meriton has been the leader of the party since June 2017 (party president). He is the third president of the party since its creation in 1964. Meriton was preceded by former President of Seychelles James Michel.

During the era of one-party rule, the party was funded by dues paid by its members and from foreign governments including Tanzania, Algeria, Libya and East Germany.

The party maintains branches in each electoral district and utilizes an extensive system of patronage. At the parliamentary election in 2011, the party won 88.56% of the popular vote and all 31 seats in the National Assembly. That fell to 49.22% and 14 seats in the national assembly after the parliamentary election in 2016, leaving the party in parliamentary opposition for the first time.
From 1993 (when opposition parties were legalised) to 2011, candidates from the party won all the presidential elections in the first round, while in 2016 they won in the second round, and in 2020 they lost for the first time. The party also held a majority in the National Assembly independence until 2016. Seychelles opposition candidate Wavel Ramkalawan won in the 2020 Seychellois general election with 54.9 percent of valid votes cast, upsetting incumbent President Danny Faure of United Seychelles. The party lost its first presidential poll in over 40 years since Seychelles gained independence. United Seychellois lost also in the General Assembly elections and Linyon Demokratik Seselwa (LDS) held its clear majority in the parliament.

After Vincent Meriton stepped down as party leader, Patrick Herminie was elected as the new leader in 2021.

Electoral history

Presidential elections

National Assembly elections

Former logos

Notable people 

 Clifford Andre
 Joevana Charles
 Ansley Constance
 Charles DeCommarmond
 Ginette Gamatis
 Wilby Lucas
 Marc Naiken
 Roy Nibourette
 David Payet
 Marie-Antoinette Rose
 Vicky Theresine
 Jennifer Vel
 Marc Volcere
 Waven William

Notes

References

External links
 United Seychelles
 Website of The People newspaper

Political parties in Seychelles
Parties of one-party systems
Political parties established in 1964
1964 establishments in Africa
Socialism in Seychelles